George Jefferson Dwire (June 6, 1923 – August 12, 1974) was an Arkansas small businessman and the third husband of Virginia Clinton Kelley, and a stepfather of former U.S. President Bill Clinton and Roger Clinton Jr.

Early life 
He was born in Bodcaw, Arkansas. A veteran of World War II, Dwire was injured during a parachute jump and had later worked as a carpenter.  He had worked his way through college as a hairdresser.  Other occupations and avocations included playing football, teaching judo, building homes, and selling oil-well equipment and securities.

Marriage 
Dwire, who had three daughters from a previous marriage, met Kelley when she patronized the beauty salon he owned.  They married on January 3, 1969, in Hope, Arkansas; the ceremony was performed by the Rev. John Miles, and Bill Clinton served as the best man.  He also played and sang at the reception. Earlier, in August, Clinton had watched the Chicago Democratic convention on television with Dwire.  Family and friends of the bride discouraged the union because Dwire was an ex-convict, having served nine months in prison in 1962 for stock fraud.

Dwire and the Clinton family 
Hillary Clinton, then Hillary Rodham, described Dwire as a "supportive ally" in her attempts to forge a relationship with Bill Clinton's mother while Rodham was dating the future president.  He also counseled Clinton concerning the draft, decisions involving which would become a major issue in his presidential campaign. Since Dwire and his new wife married later in life, the prospects of having children together were not favorable. At that time, Clarice Minner, their young babysitter and housekeeper, became pregnant with her second child. On October 12, 1969, with Virginia Dwire at her side as the anesthesiologist, she gave birth to a little girl.  She named her daughter "Jeffrey" Lynn Smith as a sign of adoration to the couple.

Legacy 
A 1967 Ford Mustang that he bought played a role in the 1992 presidential campaign and was a favorite nostalgia item of Bill Clinton.  It is currently on display at the Museum of Automobiles in Arkansas. The Clinton family's housekeeper at the time, Clarice Minner Hay, who was expecting a child, had so much admiration for the family that she named her daughter after Jeff. Her child subsequently became Jeffrey Lynn Smith.  Jeffrey went missing three weeks before Christmas in 1985 while walking home from school in Hot Springs, Arkansas. She was 15 years old.  Jeff Dwire died due to complications from diabetes in 1974 at the age of 51.

References

Further reading
 Clinton, Bill. My Life, Knopf (June 22, 2004). 
 Kelley, Virginia. Leading with My Heart (with James Morgan), Pocket,

External links 
 Missing: Jeffrey Lynn Smith at WebCitation
 Out of Obscurity Pt 1 of 2-Rev on YouTube

1923 births
1974 deaths
People from Nevada County, Arkansas
People from Hope, Arkansas
Family of Bill and Hillary Clinton
Businesspeople from Arkansas
20th-century American businesspeople
Deaths from diabetes
20th-century American politicians
American military personnel of World War II